The 1964 North Carolina lieutenant gubernatorial election was held on November 3, 1964. Democratic nominee Robert W. Scott defeated Republican nominee Clifford L. Bell with 60.77% of the vote.

Primary elections
Primary elections were held on May 30, 1964.

Democratic primary

Candidates
Robert W. Scott
H. Clifton Blue, former Speaker of the North Carolina House of Representatives
John R. Jordan Jr., State Senator

Results

Republican primary

Candidates
Clifford L. Bell, Insurance executive
Robert A. Flynt

Results

General election

Candidates
Robert W. Scott, Democratic
Clifford L. Bell, Republican

Results

References

1964
Gubernatorial
North Carolina